Mommsen is a surname, and may refer to one of a family of German historians, see Mommsen family:

 Theodor Mommsen (1817–1903), classical scholar, winner of the Nobel Prize in Literature
 Hans Mommsen (1930–2015), historian known for arguing a functionalist explanation of the Holocaust
 Wolfgang Mommsen (1930–2004), historian of 19th- and 20th-century Britain and Germany

See also 
 Momsen (especially Charles Momsen)

German-language surnames
Low German surnames
Patronymic surnames